The Mayan antthrush (Formicarius moniliger) is a species of bird in the family Formicariidae. It is found in southern Mexico through northwestern Honduras.

The Mayan antthrush (Formicarius moniliger) was formerly considered to be conspecific with the black-faced antthrush (Formicarius analis) but is now treated as a separate species based primarily on the differences in its song.

References

Mayan antthrush
Mayan antthrush
Mayan antthrush